This is a list of Japanese naval commanders. Rank is assumed to be admiral unless stated otherwise.

Post-Restoration War
 [Gombei] Yamamoto Gonnohyōe (1852–1933)
 Ijuin Gorō (1852–1921)
 Kawamura Sumiyoshi [Jungi] (1836–1904)
 Nakamuta Kuranosuke (1837–1916)
 Ito Sukemaro (1834–1906)
 Enomoto Takeaki (1836–1908)

Sino-Japanese War
 Tsuboi Kōzō [Hara Kōzō] (1843–1898)
 Hidaka Sonojo (1848–1932)
 Itō Sukeyuki (1843–1914)
 Sakamoto Toshiatsu (1858–1941)
 Saigō Tsugumichi (1843–1902)

Russo-Japanese War
 Koichi Fuiji (1858–1926)
 Shimamura Hayao (1858–1923)
 Tōgō Heihachirō (1848–1934)
 Kamimura Hikonojō (1849–1916)
 Murakami Kakuichi (1862–1927)
 Kanji Kato (1870–1939)
 Akiyama Saneyuki (1868–1918)
 Dewa Shigetō (1856–1930)
 Kataoka Shichirō (1854–1920)
 Misu Sotarō (1855–1921)
 Uryū Sotokichi (1857–1937)
 Kabayama Sukenori (1837–1922)
 Matsumura Tatsuo (1868–1932)
 Nashiba Tokioki (1850–1924)
 Katō Tomosaburō (1861–1923)
 Shibayama Yahachi (1850–1924)
 Matsumoto Yawara (1860–c. 1925)

World War I
Tetsutaro Sato (1886–1942)
Yamashita Gentarō (1863–1931)
Yamaya Tanin (1866–1940)
Yashiro Rokurō (1860–1930)
Mitsumasa Yonai (1880–1948)

World War II
 Hiroaki Abe (1889–1949)
 Masafumi Arima (1895–1944)
 Shigeru Fukudome (1891–1971)
 Boshirō Hosogaya (1888–1964)
 Matsuji Ijuin (1893–1944)
 Toshihira Inoguchi (1896–1944)
 Shigeyoshi Inoue (1889–1975)
 Seiichi Itō (1890–1945)
 Kakuji Kakuta (1890–1944)
 Mineichi Koga (1885–1944)
 Teruhisa Komatsu (1888–1970)
 Nobutake Kondō (1886–1953)
 Takeo Kurita (1889–1977)
 Kameto Kuroshima (1893–1965)
 Jinichi Kusaka (1889–1972)
 Ryūnosuke Kusaka (1892–1971)
 Gunichi Mikawa (1888–1981)
 Osami Nagano (1880–1947)
 Chūichi Nagumo (1886–1944)
 Shōji Nishimura (1889–1944)
 Tomoshige Samejima (1889–1969)
 Satō Tetsutarō (1866–1942)
 Shigetarō Shimada (1883–1976)
 Kōichi Shiozawa (1881–1943)
 Kantarō Suzuki (1868–1948)
 Sōkichi Takagi (1893–1979)
 Takeo Takagi (1892–1944)
 Ibō Takahashi (1888–1947)
 Takarabe Takeshi (1867–1949)
 Sadatoshi Tomioka (1897–1970)
 Soemu Toyoda (1885–1957)
 Matome Ugaki (1890–1945)
 Tamon Yamaguchi (1892–1942)
 Isoroku Yamamoto (1884–1943)

See also
 List of Imperial Japanese Navy admirals

Notes

Naval commanders

Commanders